San Jose, officially the Municipality of San Jose,  is a 5th class municipality in the province of Negros Oriental, Philippines. According to the 2020 census, it has a population of 21,956 people. It is the least populous town in Negros Oriental.

History
The municipality of San Jose was formerly called "Ayuquitan", a name that was born due to a communication problem between the natives and Spanish Conquistadors. The story was that one day a group of Spaniards searching for flourishing communities came upon a group of natives harvesting rice. The Spaniards approached the natives and asked the name of the place while pointing to the ground filled with piles of rice chaffs. The natives thought they were asked for the name of the pile and answered "Inoquitan". From then on, the Spaniards called the place "Inoquitan". In time, the name "Ayuquitan" was adapted from the phrase "may inoquitan". In 1902 Governor Demetrio Larena considered the place as a pueblo. Pioneer Spanish Merchant is Manuel Pastor. San Jose is the home of the old Spanish families settled since 1871 like the Patero, Amiscaray, Larena, Pareja, Siglos, Remollo, Renacia, Remata, Araco, Tatel and Remoto.

San Jose was created as a town in 1954 from the barrios of Ayuquitan, Basak, Basiao, Cambaloctot, Calo, Cancawas, Hanay-Hanay, Jilocon, Lalaan, Naiba, Tapon Norte, Tampi, and sitios Guinsayawan, Kang-atid, Kangdajonog, Guilongsoran and Kaputihanan of the barrio of Siapo, all of which formerly belonged to the former municipality of Ayuquitan and then part of the municipality of Amlan.

Geography

Barangays
San Jose is politically subdivided into 14 barangays, shown here with population as of 2015 Census:
 Basak - 827
 Basiao - 673
 Cambaloctot - 652
 Cancawas - 1,746
 Janayjanay - 938
 Jilocon - 1,944
 Naiba - 790
 Poblacion - 939
 San Roque - 942
 Santo Niño - 2,132
 Señora Ascion (Calo) - 1,913
 Siapo - 2,182
 Tampi - 2,058
 Tapon Norte - 2,677

Climate

Demographics

Economy

Education
The public elementary and secondary schools of San Jose are supervised by San Jose District of DepEd Division of Negros Oriental.

Public Elementary Schools
 Alicia C. Calumpang Elementary School
 Basak Primary School
 Cancawas Primary School
 Crisostomo O. Retes Memorial Elementary School (Tampi Elementary School)
 Guilongsoran Primary School
 Janay-janay Elementary School
 Jose R. Remollo Elementary School
 Pedro A. Remoto Elementary School
 San Jose Central Elementary School
 San Roque Primary School
 Siapo Elementary School
 Sra. Ascion Elementary School
 Tapon Norte Elementary School

Public Secondary Schools
 Cambaloctot High School
 Crisostomo O. Retes National High School (Tampi High School)
 San Jose Provincial High School (Formerly: Tampi High School-San Jose Annex) also known earlier as Poblacion High School

Tourism
The town is the gateway to the Balinsasayao Twin Lakes Natural Park in Enrique Villanueva, Sibulan Town.

One of the tourist attraction of the town was the Our Lady of Lourdes Shrine in the cane fields of Sto. Niño, where a spinning sun is said to have manifested the visit of the Lady of Lourdes, devotees flock every Saturday of the month.

The Ayuquitan Festival is held every May 7, one of the highlights of the town fiesta which is celebrated on May 10. Street dancing and showdown are the main features of the festival.

The St. Paul University Farm is located in Barangay Sra. Acion.

The Port of Tampi also serves RORO services going to the island of Cebu through the Port of Bato in the municipality of Samboan.

References

External links
 [ Philippine Standard Geographic Code]
Philippine Census Information
Local Governance Performance Management System 

Municipalities of Negros Oriental